Sorsogona is a genus of flatheads native to the Indian Ocean and the western Pacific Ocean.

Species
There are currently six recognized species in this genus:
 Sorsogona humerosa L. W. Knapp & Heemstra, 2011 (White-margined flathead)
 Sorsogona melanoptera L. W. Knapp & Wongratana, 1987 (Obscure flathead)
 Sorsogona nigripinna (Regan, 1905) (Blackfin flathead)
 Sorsogona portuguesa (J. L. B. Smith, 1953) (South African thorny flathead)
 Sorsogona prionota (Sauvage, 1873) (Halfspined flathead)
 Sorsogona tuberculata (G. Cuvier, 1829) (Tuberculated flathead)

Sorsogona is recognised by Fishbase but, apparently, does not include the type species, Sorsogona serrulata, as a species within it. Catalog of Fishes treats this genus as a synonym of Ratabulus .

References

Platycephalidae
Taxa named by Albert William Herre